Meiri is a Jewish surname and Japanese given name. Notable people with the name include:
 Rabbi Menachem Meiri (1249 – c. 1310), a famous Catalan rabbi, Talmudist, Maimondean
 Yehudit Kafri (Meiri) (born 1935), a 20th-century Israeli poet, writer
 Yoav Meiri (born 1975, Jerusalem), an Israeli butterfly swimmer
 Goldfarb, Levy, Eran, Meiri & Co. (aka "Goldfarb"), the second-largest Israeli law firm

Hebrew-language surnames
Jewish surnames